Michael Liendl (born 25 October 1985) is an Austrian professional association football player who plays as a midfielder for Grazer AK.

Club career

Liendl started his career playing for FC Nenzing and FC Thüringen. Later on, he played for Grazer AK, Kapfenberger SV, Austria Wien and Wolfsberger AC, before moving to Germany to join Fortuna Düsseldorf in 2014, and 1860 Munich in 2015.

Later on, he played for the Dutch club Twente, then he returned to Austria to rejoin Wolfsberger AC in 2018. On 29 October 2020, Liendl scored a hat-trick in a 4–1 away win over Feyenoord in the 2020–21 UEFA Europa League, to become the third oldest player to achieve that feat, only behind Zlatan Ibrahimović and Aritz Aduriz.

On 2 June 2022, Liendl joined Grazer AK, the club where he began his professional career. He signed a one-year contract.

International career
On 3 June 2014, he made his debut for the Austria national football team under coach Marcel Koller, in a friendly away match against Czech Republic, in which he came on as a substitute to Andreas Ivanschitz in the 63rd minute. However, the match ended in a 2–1 win for Austria.

Honours
Kapfenberger SV
Austrian Football First League: 2007–08

Individual
Austrian Football First League Footballer of the Year: 2008

References

External links
Michael Liendl at oefb.at.

1985 births
Living people
Austrian footballers
Austria international footballers
Austria youth international footballers
Association football midfielders
Grazer AK players
FK Austria Wien players
Kapfenberger SV players
Fortuna Düsseldorf players
TSV 1860 Munich players
FC Twente players
Wolfsberger AC players
Austrian Football Bundesliga players
2. Liga (Austria) players
2. Bundesliga players
Eredivisie players
Austrian expatriate footballers
Expatriate footballers in Germany
Expatriate footballers in the Netherlands
Austrian expatriate sportspeople in Germany